San José del Progreso  is a town and municipality in Oaxaca in south-western Mexico. The municipality covers an area of 66.34 km². 
It is part of the Ocotlán District in the south of the Valles Centrales Region

As of 2005, the municipality had a total population of 6164.

A significant silver mine owned by Fortuna Silver Mines, a Canadian company, is located in the municipality.

References

Municipalities of Oaxaca